The Seven Great Singing Stars were seven singers of China in the 1940s.

Background
Several of the stars acted in films, and their music played a prominent role in developing Chinese cinema. They dominated the Chinese pop music industry in the 1930s and 1940s, which was centered in Shanghai, and often performed in a genre known as Shidaiqu. Amongst the earliest of the stars to emerge in the 1930s were Zhou Xuan, Gong Qiuxia, Yao Lee, and Bai Hong. In the 40s, Bai Guang, Li Xianglan (Yoshiko Yamaguchi), and Wu Yingyin also became popular, and these seven were grouped as the seven great singing stars of the period.

Shanghai was occupied by the Japanese starting from 1937 to 1945. Yoshiko, who was Japanese, came to prominence in this period although her Japanese ancestry was not revealed at that time. After the Communist victory in 1949, there began a large migration of people from Shanghai to Hong Kong, and the Communist Party of China also denounced Shanghai popular music as Yellow Music, a form of pornography, which effectively ended this period in Shanghai. The film and music industry had already begun to shift to Hong Kong in the '40s, and by the 1950s Hong Kong had become the centre of the entertainment industry. While some of the seven continued to perform for many years, Zhou Xuan died in 1957, Yoshiko retired from entertainment in 1958, and Bai Guang stopped recording in 1959.

The stars

See also
 C-pop, an overview of Chinese popular music
 Mandopop, the Mandarin-language subgenre 
 Four Heavenly Kings (Hong Kong), for the male counterpart

References

20th-century births
Chinese pop singers
7 Seven Great Singing Stars
Lists of singers
Republic of China singers
Women in music
Lists of women in music
20th-century Chinese women singers